Seydelia ellioti is a moth in the family Erebidae. It was described by Arthur Gardiner Butler in 1896. It is found in Democratic Republic of the Congo, Kenya, Malawi, Rwanda, South Africa, Tanzania and Uganda.

References

Arctiidae genus list at Butterflies and Moths of the World of the Natural History Museum

Moths described in 1896
Spilosomina